The Dryad(s) may refer to:

Music
Die Dryaden or The Dryads, ballet composed by Ludwig Minkus
Dryadi or The Dryad, a composition by Jean Sibelius for orchestra 
The Dryad, ballet composed by Dora Bright
The Dryad, ballet composed by Paul Corder

Literature
Dryaden or The Dryad, a fairy tale by Hans Christian Andersen  
The Dryad, work by Justin Huntly McCarthy

TV
"The Dryad", an episode of Canadian/Australian TV series Guinevere Jones

Animals
 The dryad (Minois dryas), a species of butterfly

See also
Dryad
Dryad (disambiguation)